Guðmundur Sigurðsson (born 9 June 1946) is an Icelandic weightlifter. He competed at the 1972 Summer Olympics and the 1976 Summer Olympics.

References

1946 births
Living people
Gudmundur Sigurdsson
Gudmundur Sigurdsson
Weightlifters at the 1972 Summer Olympics
Weightlifters at the 1976 Summer Olympics
Place of birth missing (living people)